Zilingo is a technology and commerce platform founded in 2015 by Ankiti Bose and Dhruv Kapoor, and has operations spanning Indonesia, Hong Kong, Thailand, Philippines, Australia and the United States. In January 2023, Bloomberg reported that the company was preparing to liquidate.

History

Establishment and business expansion 
Zilingo, a play on the word "zillion," was established in 2015 by two founders of Indian origin, Ankiti Bose and Dhruv Kapoor. The idea came from when Bose was on holiday in Bangkok and noticed that many of the small and medium-sized shops had no online presence.

The company began with seed funding from Sequoia India and raised an additional $8 million in a Series A funding round in September 2016. It raised an additional $18 million in 2017 in a Series B round and $54 million in a Series C round in 2018.

The company started off as a long-tail fashion marketplace leveraging Southeast Asia's growing internet connectivity to bring small merchants from the street markets of Bangkok and Jakarta into the e-commerce fold, supported by distribution, cataloguing and financing services Zilingo began to offer.

After beefing its distribution capabilities, Zilingo expanded focus towards B2B opportunities across the supply chain with an eye on service opportunities the platform could offer to transform a fragmented, inefficient, cash and tech-strapped value chain.

The focus towards B2B opportunities started with a suite of basic products to help merchants and manufacturers manage their e-commerce business. This initially included inventory management and sales tracking, and today the company has graduated to deeper services like financing, sourcing and procurement, and a ‘style hunter’ for identifying upcoming fashion trends.

So they expanded, developing software and other tools to allow vendors to access factories from Bangladesh to Vietnam and also help with cross-border shipping and inventory management. Since 2018, Zilingo has also worked with financial technology firms to provide working capital to small sellers so they can buy raw materials to produce goods. The company takes a cut whenever a deal is brokered or a sale is made via its platform, with a business model effectively removing removes a lot of the agents that brands and factories inefficiently deal with. This also ensures that profits can be evenly spread across all stakeholders in the fashion industry, thereby edging the company towards its vision of making the fashion supply chain a levelled playing field.

Global expansion 
In September 2017, Zilingo was shipping to eight countries and has seller hubs in Hong Kong, Korea, Vietnam, Cambodia, Indonesia and Thailand, adding 5,000 new merchants in the previous twelve months. By September 2019 the company generates 80% of its revenue from its business-to-business operation of matching brands with suppliers in Southeast Asia and South Asia, with aggressive moves to expand in the United States.

In 2019, the company raised $226 million in a Series D round from existing investors Sequoia India, Burda Capital, Sofina with Singapore's sovereign fund Temasek Holdings joining the tech-platform's capital table. The latest round took the tech-platform to US$308 million from investors, making it one of Southeast Asia's highest capitalised startups. The company announced that it planned to invest US$100 million to build out its fashion supply chains in the US, as part of its accelerated growth plans in new markets such as Australia, Europe and the Middle East.

Corporate restructuring 
Amidst the global economic slowdown due to the COVID-19 pandemic, Zilingo announced that it was laying off 5% of its global workforce. A total of 44 employees based in Singapore were dismissed via a Zoom teleconfering call, with employees expressing disappointment at the company's decision despite the Singaporean government's 75 per cent subsidy of local employees wages and the management's lack of post-retrenchment support. The company has also been reported to close its US and Australia offices in 2020, to focus on its core business plans in Asia. In July 2020, second round of retrenchment was carried out in Thailand, India, and Indonesia offices, with an estimated additional 12% of employees being laid off globally. CFO James Perry, a veteran dealmaker, was reported to have resigned following the rounds of downsizing.

Dismissal of CEO 
On 31 March 2022, Ankiti Bose was suspended as CEO after an attempt to raise capital raised questions about the company's accounting practices, according to Bloomberg. On 20 May 2022 Bose was fired from Zilingo.

Management buyout 
On 20 June 2022, the cofounders of Zilingo, Dhruv Kapoor and Ankiti Bose, sent a proposal to the board for a management buyout (MBO). According to sources, the cofounders and an unidentified new investor group will form a new company to take over Zilingo’s assets including the factory, the sourcing business and the digital platforms Z Connect, Z Trade and Z Spotlight, while the rest of the company’s assets will be liquidated. As part of the deal, Zilingo will receive a fresh capital injection of $8 million from the new investor group.

Technology and commerce 
Zilingo started off as a mobile-first eCommerce marketplace and today has expanded into a B2B tech-platform, with services spanning different offerings for players across the fashion supply chain. The startup was notable for the seller management platform created in 2016, when Zilingo was simply a fashion eCommerce marketplace. This tool helped small retailers and long tail brands formally organise their business, through online distribution, inventory management tools and APIs for logistics.

By 2018, the startup had evolved its seller management tool to become an additional income generator for the business, with merchants being able to cross-list across Singapore, Thailand, Indonesia versions of the site, and distribute globally. The platform had also begun offering financial services from third parties, a “style hunter” that aggregates upcoming trends from fashion watchers and icons, product sourcing and content and photography services—and Zilingo's captive seller base expanded to include professional fashion sellers, SMEs, brands in Southeast Asia and B2B businesses globally through Zilingo's "Zilingo Asia Mall" platform.

References 

Online retailers of Singapore
Retail companies established in 2015
2015 establishments in Singapore